Sajad Abarghouei Nejad (born 17 September 1987) in Isfahan is a footballer. He played in his early years for Zob Ahan Isfahan F.C. Juniors before starting his professional career with Bargh United F.C. He moved to Sepahan Novin F.C. in 2009 and after that to Foolad Natanz F.C. in 2010.

References 

1987 births
Living people
Foolad Natanz players
Iranian footballers
Association football forwards